Nodopelta is a genus of sea snails, marine gastropod mollusks in the family Peltospiridae.

Species
Species within the genus Nodopelta include:
 Nodopelta heminoda McLean, 1989
 Nodopelta rigneae Warén & Bouchet, 2001
 Nodopelta subnoda McLean, 1989

References

Peltospiridae